BUO is the IATA code of Burao Airport in Somaliland.

buo is the ISO 639 code of the Terei language of Papua New Guinea.

See also 
 Ilario Di Buò (1965-), an archer from Italy